All I Am may refer to:

"All I Am" (Jess Glynne song), 2018
"All I Am" (Lynsey de Paul and Susan Sheridan song), 1980
"All I Am", a song by Alice in Chains from Rainier Fog